Diligent Corporation, known as Diligent, is a software as a service company that enables board members of corporations, government organisations, and not-for-profit groups to share and collaborate information for board meetings. Headquartered in New York City, and incorporated in tax haven Delaware, the company has offices in Galway, Ireland; London, UK; Washington, D.C.; Munich, Germany; Budapest, Hungary; Hong Kong;India and China.

The company's main products are based on a software as a service model and sold by subscription. These include corporate governance technologies, such as a board portal for messaging, and voting tools for board directors and executives. Diligent's products are used by 40 percent of all Fortune 1000 companies.

History

Early history 
Diligent was founded by Brian Henry and Kiri Borg in 1994 as Manhattan Creative Partners (MCP). In 1998, SunAmerica became a client of Manhattan Creative Partners after SunAmerica director Peter Harbeck and Brian Henry discovered a joint passion as airplane owners and recreational pilots. In 1999, Alessandro Sodi was hired and trained by Henry and Borg to assist in account management. Eventually, Henry turned over the day-to-day management of the SunAmerica account to Sodi.

In 2000, when SunAmerica expressed their desire to do away with their burdensome hard-copy corporate board paper books, Henry conceived of and hand-drew the design for the original and first web-based "Boardbook." Marco Morsella, the first employee hired by Henry and Borg in 1997 to be MCP's graphic designer, created a digital GUI based on Henry's design. SunAmerica became the first company to license the new, web-based Boardbook. Henry and Borg, and later the Diligent Partners, recognized the value of this innovative technology and invested most of the profits from other consultancy projects into the continuing development of the new software product.

New company 
In 2003, Henry and Borg formed Diligent Partners, together with Sharon Daniels, Dan Kiley, Kenneth Carroll, Alessandro Sodi, Marc Daniels and Robert Craig. Henry was named CEO of the new entity, Sodi, President, and Carroll, chairman. At the same time, the company renamed MCP to Diligent Board Member Services "to reflect the firm's shift of focus to corporate governance service delivery." By 2006, Diligent had expanded to Europe, Canada, and the UK.

Initial public offering
Diligent listed on the New Zealand Exchange (NZX) in 2007 with a $24m NZX IPO, valuing the company at $115m. While fundraising for the company was successful, prior to the company listing, some information became public regarding bankruptcies of original founder and CEO Brian Henry and his brother Gerald Henry. These bankruptcies occurred in the late 1980s due to the 1987 share market crash. Gerald Henry was given a jail term for fraud in 1991 due to a subset of US law. Diligent released a statement clarifying that Gerald Henry was not associated with the company.

The day following Diligent's listing, the company announced Henry's resignation as CEO due to the oversight of the disclosure of this information. However, some journalists at the time claimed that Diligent's PR firm and attorneys "should have advised Henry to publicly acknowledge his history." In fact, Diligent's IPO attorney, Mark Russell, said his firm, Buddle Findlay, "was proud to have our brand associated with Diligent and with Brian in particular. We have no concerns whatsoever." It was reported that "Diligent's promoters and directors, including director Mark Russell of law firm Buddle Findlay, knew of Brian's connection with Energycorp, but decided not to disclose. Coincidentally, Russell, in the 1980s, worked for the Bank of New Zealand, which had lent the company $15.5m on a handshake." Henry was replaced by Alessandro Sodi, who was then President. Henry remained on the Board, his value to the company recognised by the other members of the board. Diligent's share price collapsed to $0.14 by March 2009, but later recovered to lead the pack of technology listings.

Company growth and revenue restatement issues
With the release of the Apple iPad in 2010, Diligent developed an app for this new platform and commenced a period of explosive growth in client numbers. Diligent made its first operating profit in 2012. Between 2011 and 2012, company revenue grew by 165%. By mid-2013, the Diligent stock price had reached over $8.00 NZD a share.

In August 2013, Diligent announced that it would need to restate revenue for the current and preceding three years due to discrepancies in company accounting practices. No fraud was involved, though the company was required to recognize revenue from the date of a contract being signed rather than the start of a month, and its installation fees recognized over a longer period of time. The company also acknowledged that its accounting systems were underdeveloped and required improvement. It was fined by the NZX for a number of minor breaches of listing rules.

Alessandro Sodi stepped down as CEO in 2015 to focus on the launch of Diligent Teams as Chief Product Strategy Officer. Sodi was succeeded by current CEO Brian Stafford, an ex-Mckinsey partner and software-as-a-service specialist.

Return to private ownership 
On 14 February 2016, Diligent announced that it had entered into a definitive agreement to be acquired by Insight Partners for consideration of $4.90 per share, valuing the company at $624M USD, subject to approval from the shareholders. A Shareholder meeting was held in Auckland, NZ on 13 April 2016 and having received 57% votes in favor of the Merger (as it was structured), Diligent de-listed from the NZX and returned into private hands. The merger was opposed by the NZ Shareholders Association who considered the offer too low, stating that "the current offer is low compared to where the company's prospects have been in the past"

Since 2016, Diligent has restructured its leadership team and acquired new companies, including Brainloop, BoardPad, Boardroom Resources and Manzama.

In December 2018, Diligent announced the launch of the Diligent Institute, a think tank aiming to provide customers with global research on governance practices.

Modern Leadership Initiative 
In June 2020, Diligent launched its Modern Leadership Initiative and partnered with more than 20 private equity companies to improve board-level diversity. Each private equity firm agreed to open board seats of five of their portfolio companies to racially diverse candidates. The private equity firms included Insight Partners, Vista Equity Partners, Hellman & Friedman, Hg, Genstar Capital, The Jordan Company, and TA Associates, and also New Mountain Capital, Francisco Partners, Heidrick & Struggles, Egon Zehnder, and the American Investment Council.

Corporate affairs

Leadership 
Diligent is managed by CEO Brian Stafford. Other key executives are:

 Amanda Carty, Chief Marketing Officer
 Avigail Dadone, Chief People Officer
Lisa Edwards, President and Chief Operating Officer
 Satheesh Ravala, Chief Technology Officer
 Michael Stanton, Chief Financial Officer
 Dan Zitting, Chief Product Officer
 Jack Van Arsdale, General Counsel

Customer and revenue 
In 2019, the company reported more than 16,500 customers and 550,000 individual users from more than 90 countries. In 2018, the company reported revenues exceeding $200 million and in July 2019 crossed $300 million in annual recurring revenue (ARR).

Products
Diligent's products are based on a software as a service model and sold by subscription. They are joined within the “Governance Cloud” and offer a secure set of corporate governance software. After the COVID-19 outbreak Diligent in March 2020 started to offer K–12 public school districts and mission-based nonprofits free access to its board software.

Awards
Diligent was recognized in the Deloitte Technology Fast 500 three times, ranking #98 in 2014, #420 in 2016 and #433 in 2020.

In 2018 and 2019, Diligent was named one of Inc. 5000’s Fastest Growing Private Companies in America.

References

External links
 Official website
Diligent Institute

Financial software companies
Software companies of New Zealand
Software companies established in 1994
Companies listed on the New Zealand Exchange
Software companies based in New York City
Business software companies
As a service